Goose Lake is a small lake in Anchorage in the U.S. state of Alaska, located near the University of Alaska Anchorage,  south-east of confluence of North and South Forks Chester Creek, and  south-east of Anchorage, Cook Inlet Low. It is a popular swimming location in summer, with one of two municipal beaches, and is connected to the city's extensive trail system.  It is a kettle lake.

See also 
 List of lakes of Alaska

References 

 

Beaches of Alaska
Lakes of Alaska
Bodies of water of Anchorage, Alaska
Kettle lakes in the United States